Ori Reisman (1924–1991) was an Israeli painter.

Biography 
Ori Reisman was born in Tel Yosef the in Mandatory Palestine. He studied art at the studio of Yitzhak Frenkel. In 1943, Reisman was one of the founders of Kibbutz Beit HaArava in the north of the Dead Sea. In 1946, he married Mazal Hamdi, whose Yemenite roots became an inspiration for his artwork.  After the kibbutz was evacuated during the 1948 Arab–Israeli War, Reisman and his colleagues founded Kibbutz Kabri in the Western Galilee.

Art career
 
In the early 1950s, Reisman spent two years in Paris studying at the École Nationale des Beaux-Arts and attending painter Jean Souverbie's Monumental Art workshop. Israeli artists Lea Nikel, Eliahu Gat, and Michael Gross were also in Paris at the time, and Reisman formed long-lasting friendships with them. Upon his return to the kibbutz, Reisman opened a studio in an abandoned building, where he worked on his art several times a week. He painted landscapes, portraits and still-life in bright colors. He began to exhibit his work in solo and group exhibitions. He spent more time in Paris in the 1970s. In 1974 he joined the "Aklim" (Climate) Group.

Awards and recognition
 1953 Prize "Concours le Franc" Ecole National de Beaux Arts, Paris
 1989 Gutman Histadrut Prize for Painting and Sculpture

See also
Visual arts in Israel

References

External links 
 
 

1924 births
1991 deaths
20th-century Israeli painters
Israeli expatriates in France